is an animation brand of Studio Hibari (Japanese for "lark") established in 2011. Seiji Kishi and Masaomi Andō have been common director collaborators of the brand since its founding.

Works

Television series

Films

OVAs/ONAs

References

External links
  
 

 
Japanese animation studios
Japanese companies established in 2011
Mass media companies established in 2011